Olexander Motsyk (born 3 May 1955, in Volodymyrets Raion, Rivne Oblast, Soviet Union) is a Ukrainian diplomat. Ambassador Extraordinary and Plenipotentiary (1999)

Education 
 Taras Shevchenko National University of Kyiv, School of International Relations, Department of International Law (summa cum laude, 1981). Languages: English, Russian, Polish

Career 
07.1981-05.1985 — Third secretary, Consular Department, Ministry of Foreign Affairs of Ukraine

05.1985-04.1987 — Third, Second Secretary, Department of International Organizations, Ministry of Foreign Affairs of Ukraine

04.1987-09.1990 — Second, First secretary, HR Department, Ministry of Foreign Affairs of Ukraine

09.1990-04.1992 — First secretary, Directorate General for Treaties and Legal Affairs, Ministry of Foreign Affairs of Ukraine

04.1992-08.1995 — Second, First Secretary, Counselor, Permanent Mission of Ukraine to the UN, New York City

08.1995-11.1997 — Director General, Directorate General for Treaties and Legal Affairs, Ministry of Foreign Affairs of Ukraine

11.1997-11.2001 — Ambassador Extraordinary and Plenipotentiary of Ukraine to the Republic of Turkey

11.2001-07.2003 — Deputy State Secretary, Ministry of Foreign Affairs of Ukraine

07.2003-07.2004 — Deputy Minister, Ministry of Foreign Affairs of Ukraine

07.2004-02.2005 — First Deputy Minister for European Integration, Ministry of Foreign Affairs of Ukraine

02.2005-12.2005 — First Deputy State Secretary, First Deputy Head, Secretariat of President of Ukraine

01.2006–06.2010— Ambassador Extraordinary and Plenipotentiary of Ukraine to the Republic of Poland

06.2010-04.2015 — Ambassador Extraordinary and Plenipotentiary of Ukraine to the United States of America

11.2010-04.2015 — Ambassador Extraordinary and Plenipotentiary of Ukraine to Antigua and Barbuda with Residence in the U.S.

07.2011-04.2015 — Permanent Observer of Ukraine at the Organization of American States

09.2011-04.2015 — Ambassador Extraordinary and Plenipotentiary of Ukraine to the Republic of Trinidad and Tobago with Residence in the U.S.

Professional activity 
1993 — Reporter of the Sixth Committee (Legal Committee), 48th Session of the U.N. General Assembly

1994-1995 — Vice-Chairperson of the U.N. Ad Hoc Committee on the Elaboration of an International Convention Dealing with the Safety and Security of the United Nations and Associated Personnel

1995-2005 — Headed a number of Ukrainian delegations on bilateral and multilateral negotiations, and international forums.

2002-2005 — National Coordinator of Organization of the Black Sea Economic Cooperation (BSEC)

2004 — Agent of Ukraine before the International Court of Justice in the case concerning Maritime Delimitation in the Black Sea (Romania v. Ukraine)

2004-2005 — National Coordinator of GUAM (Regional economic organization of Georgia, Ukraine, Azerbaijan, and Moldova)

Author publications 
Author of numerous essays and articles in the field of International Law and International Relations. The main topics are: succession of States in respect of State property, archives and debts; the Maritime Law; BSEC; GUAM; bilateral Ukrainian-Turkish, Ukrainian-Polish and Ukrainian-American relations.

Honorary awards 
 The Order of Merit, III Degree (2001)
 Honorary Award, I Degree of the Ministry of Foreign Affairs of Ukraine for individual contribution to the development of Ukrainian diplomatic service and successful protection of Ukrainian interests on international arena. (2004).
 The Order of Justice, I Degree of the World Jurist Association (2005)
 The Order of Merit, II Degree (2006)
 Commander Cross and Star of the Order of Merit of the Republic of Poland (Krzyż Komandorski z Gwiazdą Orderu Zasługi RP)(2010)

References

External links
 Ambassador from Ukraine: Who Is Oleksandr Motsyk?
 Embassy of Ukraine in the United States of America
 The EU Inside Out: A Panel Discussion with Žygimantas Pavilionis, Ambassador of Lithuania to the US, and Olexander Motsyk, Ambassador of Ukraine to the US
 Olexander Motsyk, ambassador of Ukraine to the United States
 AMBASSADOR OF UKRAINE OLEXANDER MOTSYK
 UKRAINE'S AMBASSADOR TO THE U.S. OLEXANDER MOTSYK MEETS WITH LEADING U.S. COMPANIES
 Olexander Motsyk, Ambassador of Ukraine, "Ukraine: Between East and West"

Living people
1955 births
People from Rivne Oblast
Taras Shevchenko National University of Kyiv, Institute of International Relations alumni
Ambassadors of Ukraine to the United States
Ambassadors of Ukraine to Poland
Ambassadors of Ukraine to Turkey
Ukrainian politicians
Laureates of the Honorary Diploma of the Verkhovna Rada of Ukraine
Recipients of the Honorary Diploma of the Cabinet of Ministers of Ukraine